Mighty Morphin Alien Rangers is a Power Rangers mini-series set immediately after the end of the third season of Mighty Morphin Power Rangers. As with the third season of Mighty Morphin Power Rangers, this mini-series adapted footage and costumes from the eighteenth Super Sentai series, Ninja Sentai Kakuranger.

During fight scenes (and during the opening theme) an alternate version of the MMPR theme song was played, saying "Go Go Alien Rangers" instead of "Go Go Power Rangers", although the premiere episode "Alien Rangers of Aquitar" still uses the "Go Go Power Rangers" theme.

Synopsis

Picking up where the third season of Mighty Morphin Power Rangers left off, Master Vile has used the Orb of Doom to reverse the ages of everybody on Earth, including the Power Rangers, reducing them to children. However, unlike the last time, the rangers retain their memories of the proper time thanks to the Ninja Power Coins. Unfortunately, the rangers are unable to morph and fight; Zordon recruits the Alien Rangers of the planet Aquitar for help. These Rangers are humanoid, partially aquatic aliens and though Earth's environment is ultimately inhospitable to them, they agree to help. Master Vile's plans are foiled, and he leaves in annoyance, but Lord Zedd and Rita Repulsa remain and intend to conquer Earth.

Hoping to restore the Rangers' proper ages, Billy Cranston builds a Regenerator powered by the Ninja Power Coins. However, only Billy is restored to normal before the device is stolen by Goldar and Rito Revolto. The Power Coins are then destroyed by Rita and Zedd. With the human Rangers' powers destroyed, only the Aquitian Rangers stand between Earth and the forces of evil, and they can't stay on Earth forever. Ultimately, Zordon realizes that only one thing can restore everything to normal: the Zeo Crystal, which the human Rangers had split into five sub-crystals and scattered throughout time to keep it safe from Master Vile.

The five young Rangers are each sent back to a different country and point in time to find a sub-crystal. Upon success, they are returned to the present. All the while, the Aquitian Rangers, Billy, Zordon and Alpha 5 fend off the forces of Lord Zedd and Rita. The villains also plot to destroy the Command Center and steal the completed Zeo Crystal.

Ultimately, Zedd and Rita succeed in summoning the Aquitian Rangers' arch-foe, Hydro-Hog, to destroy them. After a great deal of difficulty, the Aquitian Rangers destroy him. Meanwhile, Aisha Campbell acquires the final sub-crystal in Africa. However, she chooses to remain in exchange for the sub-crystal and new friend Tanya Sloan goes in her place. Once the Zeo Crystal is recombined in a machine devised by Billy, Earth is restored to normal. The teenaged Rangers bid thanks and farewell to their Aquitian counterparts, who return to Aquitar. However, Goldar and Rito Revolto steal the Zeo Crystal out of the Command Center and their bomb goes off soon afterwards. The Rangers are teleported to safety just before the Command Center is destroyed.

Aftermath
The series sets up the transition from Mighty Morphin Power Rangers to Power Rangers Zeo. The two-part premiere of the latter resolved the cliffhanger ending and established the Rangers' new powers (as well as new foes, the Machine Empire).

The Aquitian Rangers are later seen or referenced in further seasons. Cestro returns unmorphed in "Graduation Blues", seeking Billy's help against the Hydro-Contaminators. Cestro later briefly appears with Delphine in "Revelations of Gold". The Aquitian and Zeo Rangers team-up in the "Rangers of Two Worlds" two-parter, the first instance on the series of two full teams appearing together. The two-parter also centered around Billy rapidly aging because of his use of the regenerator. In "Countdown to Destruction" in Power Rangers in Space, the Aquitian Rangers battle and are overwhelmed by Divatox's forces. Aurico later appears morphed in the Power Rangers Wild Force episode, "Forever Red", which saw every previous Red Ranger (save Rocky, as Jason returned to his previous role as Red Ranger, for which Rocky originally replaced him) united to stop the remnants of the Machine Empire. All five Rangers would later return in the series finale of Power Rangers Super Megaforce to battle alongside other veteran Ranger teams and the Megaforce Rangers.

Characters

Aquitian Rangers

 Aurico  The Red Aquitian Ranger, portrayed by David Bacon. Aurico leads the Rangers in battle, and devises strategies that ensure victory. His symbol is the circle and he uses ninjutsu to vanish from one place and appear in another to dodge his enemies. He pilots the Red Battle Borg and, during his stay on Earth, the Red Shogunzord, as well. Years later he joined nine other Red Rangers to fight the Machine Empire on the moon. He did not appear unmorphed in this episode, and was voiced by Christopher Glenn. 
 Corcus  The Black Aquitian Ranger, portrayed by Alan Palmer. He is the quietest member of the team, often lurking in the background, but fights with extreme ferocity against his enemies. The Black Aquitian Ranger's symbol is the pentagon. He controls the Black Battle Borg and the Black Shogunzord.
 Cestro  The Blue Aquitian Ranger, portrayed by Karim Prince. Cestro is the brains of the team. A master of technology, he creates weapons and devices that get the Aquitian Rangers out of tough situations. He is entrusted with the power of the Blue Battleborg and Blue Shogunzord. The Blue Aquitian Ranger's symbol is the square. His special attack is called the Aquitar Water Fall.
 Tideus  The Yellow Aquitian Ranger, portrayed by Jim Gray. He is a very strong and levelheaded individual. He is also the first male Yellow Ranger, a tradition which occurs frequently in the Sentai counterpart, but does not happen again in the American releases until Dustin becomes the Yellow Wind Ranger in Power Rangers Ninja Storm several years later. Tideus was entrusted with the power of the Yellow Battle Borg and the Yellow Shogunzord. The Yellow Aquitian Ranger's symbol is the triangle. He can send yellow triangular energy beams at his enemies (created by slashing his sword through the air in a triangular motion). 
 Delphine  The White Aquitian Ranger, the leader of the Alien Rangers. She's portrayed by Rajia Baroudi. She is the first female leader and White Ranger. Her symbol is the arrow (left-pointing on her helmet's forehead, downward-pointing on her visor). She pilots the White Battle Borg and the White Shogunzord. Delphine has more endurance and can survive far longer outside of water than her team.

Allies
 Billy Cranston  He is portrayed as a child by Justin Timsit and as a teenager by David Yost.
 Thomas "Tommy" Oliver  He is portrayed as a child by Michael R. Gotto and as a teenager by Jason David Frank.
 Rocky DeSantos  He is portrayed as a child by Michael J. O'Laskey and as a teenager by Steve Cardenas.
 Aisha Campbell  She is portrayed as a child by Sicily Sewell and as a teenager by Karan Ashley.
 Adam Park  He is portrayed as a child by Matthew Sakimoto and as a teenager by Johnny Yong Bosch.
 Katherine "Kat" Hillard  She is portrayed as a child by Julia Jordan and as a teenager by Catherine Sutherland.
 Tanya Sloan  She is portrayed as a child by Khanya Mkhize and as a teenager by Nakia Burrise
 Zordon  He is voiced by Robert L. Manahan.
 Alpha 5  He is voiced by Richard Steven Horvitz (credited as Richard Wood).
 Farkus "Bulk" Bulkmeier  He is portrayed as a child by Cody Slaton and as a teenager by Paul Schrier.
 Eugene "Skull" Skullovitch  He is portrayed as a child by Ross J. Samya and as a teenager by Jason Narvy.

Villains
 Master Vile  He is voiced by Simon Prescott.
 Rita Repulsa  She is portrayed by Carla Perez and voiced by Barbara Goodson.
 Lord Zedd  He is portrayed by Edwin Neal (credited as Ed Neil) and voiced by Robert Axelrod.
 Goldar  He is voiced by Kerrigan Mahan. 
 Rito Revolto  He is voiced by Bob Papenbrook.
 Squatt  He is voiced by Michael Sorich (credited as Michael J. Sorich).
 Baboo  He is voiced by Dave Mallow (credited as Colin Phillips).
 Finster  He is voiced by Robert Axelrod.
 Hydro Hog  A known enemy of the Aquitan Rangers. He is voiced by Brad Orchard.
 Monsters (note: all voice actors uncredited)
 Parrot Top  He is voiced by Matt K. Miller.
 See-Monster  He is voiced by Brian Tahash.
 Crabby Cabbie  He is voiced by Michael Sorich.
 Garbage Mouth  He is voiced by Matt K. Miller.
 Brick Bully  He is voiced by Richard Epcar the first time and by Brian Tahash the second time.
 Professor Longnose  He is voiced by Kirk Thornton.
 Slotsky  He is voiced by Jimmy Theodore.
 Eric and Merrick, The Barbaric Brothers  Voice actors Michael Sorich.
 Bratboy  He is voiced by Paul Schrier.
 Witchblade  She is voiced by Wendee Lee.
 Arachnofiend  She is voiced by Julie Maddalena.

Episodes

Home media
The Mighty Morphin Power Rangers: The Complete Series boxset from Shout! Factory released on July 11, 2012 (through San Diego Comic-Con), August 13, 2012 (through Time Life), and November 20, 2012 (at wide retail). All 10 episodes of Alien Rangers are featured on the fifth disc included in the Mighty Morphin Power Rangers Season 3 DVD case of said boxset, marking the series as season 3.5. The boxset was re-released on October 18, 2016 (at wide retail) with new cover art packaging for the set, but is otherwise identical to the previous 2012 releases. On August 7, 2018 a new version of the boxset released featuring a "25th Anniversary" Steelbook and included Mighty Morphin Power Rangers: The Movie on Blu-ray (the rest of the set is still DVD).

On September 24, 2013, the complete Mighty Morphin Alien Rangers series was released individually onto DVD. On August 13, 2019 a new version of Mighty Morphin Power Rangers Season 3 was released in a steelbook case with all 10 episodes of Alien Rangers on an extra fifth disc.

The series was also later included in the 20 season limited edition Power Rangers: Legacy boxset released on January 2, 2014.

See also

 Power Rangers
 Mighty Morphin Power Rangers
 Ninja Sentai Kakuranger
 Power Rangers Zeo
 Power Rangers Turbo
 Mighty Morphin Power Rangers (video game)
 List of Mighty Morphin Power Rangers home video releases

Notes

External links
 Official Power Rangers Website
 

1990s American television miniseries
1990s American science fiction television series
1996 American television series debuts
1996 American television series endings
Fox Broadcasting Company original programming
Power Rangers episodes
Power Rangers series
Mighty Morphin Power Rangers
English-language television shows
Television series by Saban Entertainment
Television series about size change
American superhero television series
Television shows filmed in Los Angeles
Television shows filmed in Santa Clarita, California
American children's action television series
American children's adventure television series
American children's fantasy television series
Fox Kids
ABS-CBN original programming
Television series created by Haim Saban
Television series created by Shuki Levy